The Arches Cluster is the densest known star cluster in the Milky Way, about 100 light-years from its center in the constellation Sagittarius (The Archer), 25,000 light-years from Earth.
Its discovery was reported by Nagata et al. in 1995, and independently by Cotera et al. in 1996.
Due to extremely heavy optical extinction by dust in this region, the cluster is obscured in the visual bands, and is observed in the X-ray, infrared and radio bands. It contains approximately 135 young, very hot stars that are many times larger and more massive than the Sun, plus many thousands of less massive stars.

The star cluster is estimated to be around two and a half million years old.  Although larger and denser than the nearby Quintuplet Cluster, it appears to be slightly younger. Only stars earlier and more massive than O5 have evolved away from the main sequence while the Quintuplet Cluster includes a number of hot supergiants as well as a red supergiant and three luminous blue variables.

The most prominent members of the Arches Cluster are hot emission line stars: thirteen Wolf–Rayet stars, all massive hydrogen-rich types; and eight class O hypergiants. One of these is an eclipsing binary with a Wolf-Rayet primary and a class O supergiant secondary. X-ray emission from the cluster suggests that many other members are also in close binary systems with two hot luminous members, but there is little evidence of the evolution of these stars being affected by binary mass exchange. The spectral classes and their properties merge smoothly from the main sequence to normal class O giants and supergiants, to class O hypergiants, to the presumed most evolved Wolf-Rayets. One star is intermediate between WN8-9h and O4-6 Ia+. There are no cooler evolved stars.

Work by Donald Figer, an astronomer at the Rochester Institute of Technology suggests that 150 solar masses is the upper limit of stellar mass in the current era of the universe. He used the Hubble Space Telescope to observe about a thousand stars in the Arches cluster and found no stars over that limit despite a statistical expectation that there should be several. The limit of 150 solar masses was previously deduced by Carsten Weidner & Pavel Kroupa using observations of the cluster R136.

References

External links
 The Arches Cluster — ESO Image Gallery
 
 
 

Open clusters
Sagittarius (constellation)
Wolf–Rayet stars